Erbessa cuneiplaga is a moth of the family Notodontidae first described by Louis Beethoven Prout in 1918. It is found in Suriname, French Guiana and Brazil.

References

Moths described in 1918
Notodontidae of South America